Nigerian chiefs may refer to:

 Nigerian traditional rulers, Nigeria's statutory monarchs

 Subordinate titleholders in the Nigerian chieftaincy system, figures such as the Ogboni amongst the Yoruba and the Nze na Ozo amongst the Igbo